Cytharomorula paucimaculata is a species of sea snail, a marine gastropod mollusk in the family Muricidae, the murex snails or rock snails.

Description

Distribution
This marine species occurs off Japan and Papua New Guinea.

References

 Houart R. (2013) Revised classification of a group of small species of Cytharomorula Kuroda, 1953 (Muricidae: Ergalataxinae) from the Indo-West Pacific. Novapex 14(2): 25-34

External links
 Sowerby, G. B., III. (1903). Descriptions of fourteen new species of marine molluscs from Japan. Annals and Magazine of Natural History, Series 7. 12: 496-501

Gastropods described in 1903
Cytharomorula